Arethaea constricta, known generally as the prairie thread-leg katydid or constricted thread-leg katydid, is a species of phaneropterine katydid in the family Tettigoniidae. It is found in North America.

Subspecies
These two subspecies belong to the species Arethaea constricta:
 Arethaea constricta comanche Hebard, 1936
 Arethaea constricta constricta Brunner von Wattenwyl, 1878

References

Phaneropterinae
Articles created by Qbugbot
Insects described in 1878